Wendy Morgan (born 1958) is an English actress. She won the award of "Best Newcomer — Actress" at the Evening Standard British Film Awards in 1980.

Theatre appearances
Morgan appeared at the National Theatre as Tamar in Peter Shaffer's Yonadab and in the title role in Martine by Jean-Jacques Bernard,
 for which she received Olivier and Evening Standard Award nominations. Other NT productions featuring Morgan have included A Streetcar Named Desire, Bacchai, Carrington, You Can't Take It With You, As I Lay Dying, The Pied Piper, Coriolanus, and Animal Farm.

Other work in theatre includes: The Invisible Woman/Like Mother, Marilyn and Ella, Pack Up Your Troubles, The Winslow Boy, The Merchant of Venice, A Christmas Carol, My Mother Said I Never Should, Road to Nirvana, Romeo and Juliet, The Woman Who Cooked Her Husband, Oh, What a Lovely War!, Othello, As You Like It, Stars in the Morning, The Passing Out Parade and Crimes of the Heart. In London's West End she appeared in Piaf.

She appeared again at the Royal National Theatre in Phèdre as Panope in 2009 and in Henry IV, Part 1 and Part 2 at the Theatre Royal, Bath as Lady Mortimer/Doll Tearsheet in 2011.

She also played Puck in Jenny Hall's Zoom production of A Midsummer Nights Dream on March 31, 2021 managing to convey magic in a very small picture frame without wires, costume or wings.

Television appearances

1978: Play for Today: Soldiers Talking Cleanly, as Brigitta
1980: Armchair Thriller: High Tide, as Celia (4 episodes)
1981: BBC2 Playhouse: Skylark, as Phyllida
1981: Andrina as Andrina
1982: Othello, as Bianca
1982: Dick Turpin, the Godmother (season four), as Tabitha (1 episode)
1983: Pictures, as Ruby Sears (episode 1.1)
1984: The Jewel in the Crown, as Susan Layton (11 episodes)
1991: The Play on One, as Liz (1 episode)
1991: The Ruth Rendell Mysteries: Means of Evil, as Hannah Kingman (2 episodes)
1991: Casualty: Allegiance, as Elaine
1992: Love Hurts: Crawling from the Wreckage, as Miriam (1 episode)
1993: Full Stretch, as Tanya Levick (1 episode)
1994: The Fame Factor: The Battersea Bardot, as Carol White
1994: The Bill: Hey Diddle Diddle, as Barbara Towner
1995: Casualty: Learning Curve, as Tracey Myhill
1995: Blood and Water, (an installment of the TV series Ghosts), as Barbara Pritchard
1995: Shine on Harvey Moon, as Helen (8 episodes)
1995: Class Act, as Sarah (1 episode)
2003: M.I.T.: Murder Investigation Team: Models and Millionaires, as Jenny Sutcliffe (1 episode)
2003: The Bill: 175
2004: Amnesia, as Anne Sellers
2004: Fingersmith, as Mrs. Cream
2005: The Commander: Blackdog, as Deirdre Warner
2007: Casualty: Life’s Too Short, as Carol Goldsmith
2007: Midsomer Murders: Death in a Chocolate Box, as Maria Godbold (Lady Holm)
2008: Wire in the Blood: Unnatural Vices, Part 1, as Bella Peters (1 episode)
2010: Casualty: Loves Me, Loves Me Not, as Denise
2013: Truckers, as Roz
2020: The Show Must Go Online, as Richard Plantagenet Duke of York, Queen Margaret, Earl of Kent & Ensemble (4 episodes), and Ebenezer Scrooge in Ian Doescher's William Shakespeare's A Christmas Carol

Film appearances
1979: Yanks, as Mollie
1979: Birth of the Beatles, as Cynthia Lennon
1980: High Tide, as Celie
1980: The Mirror Crack'd, as Cherry
1987: 84 Charing Cross Road, as Megan Wells
2017: Edie, as Nancy

References

External links

1958 births
Living people
English stage actresses
Actresses from Hertfordshire
English film actresses
Place of birth missing (living people)
English television actresses
20th-century English actresses
21st-century English actresses
People from Radlett